Andrew Anderson is a Scottish broadcast journalist.

Educated at Craigmount High School, Edinburgh; University of Stirling and Centre for Journalism Studies, University College, Cardiff.

Anderson joined Grampian Television (now STV North) in February 1988 as a reporter and presenter of the nightly regional news programme North Tonight.

He left Grampian in October 1992 to join Reuters Television as a Scotland correspondent for the then new GMTV breakfast franchise.

Anderson was a reporter for BBC Scotland in Aberdeen and Dundee from 1997 to 2022.

References

Year of birth missing (living people)
Living people
BBC Scotland newsreaders and journalists
GMTV presenters and reporters
Scottish television presenters
STV News newsreaders and journalists